Mark Anthony Leonard (born 27 September 1962) is an English former professional footballer who was a striker for a number of Football League clubs.

Leonard was born in St Helens. He started his career with non-league side Witton Albion in 1981. Over the next 18 years he played more than 400 league games scoring nearly 100 goals at a number of teams across the North West of England as well as Bradford City. It was at Bradford where he spent the longest spell of his career and he was part of the team that nearly earned promotion to the top flight in 1987–88. He scored 29 goals in 157 appearances at Bradford City.

In 1993–94, Leonard was part of the Chester City side that were promoted as runners-up in Football League Division Three, in his only season with the club. It was the first of three successive clubs he played for under manager Graham Barrow. A knee injury at the last of these, Rochdale, ended his career.

After 19 years as a professional footballer, Leonard took up crown green bowls. He won the Merseyside Merit tournament in 2001.

References

External links

1962 births
Living people
Association football forwards
Bradford City A.F.C. players
Chester City F.C. players
Crewe Alexandra F.C. players
English Football League players
English footballers
Everton F.C. players
Footballers from St Helens, Merseyside
Preston North End F.C. players
Rochdale A.F.C. players
Stockport County F.C. players
Tranmere Rovers F.C. players
Wigan Athletic F.C. players
Witton Albion F.C. players